Nativity of Jesus generally refers to Nativity of Jesus, as the biblical account of his birth.

Nativity of Jesus may also refer to:

 The Nativity (film), a 1978 American made-for-television biographical drama film
 The Nativity (play), a medieval mystery play telecast in 1952 on CBS's Westinghouse Studio One
 The Nativity Story, 2006 film
 The Nativity (TV series), shown on BBC One in 2010 between 20 December and 23 December
 The Nativity (Burne-Jones), an 1887 painting by Burne-Jones
 Nativity (film series)
 The Nativity (Piero della Francesca), a 1470–1475 painting by Piero della Francesco

See also
 Nativity of Jesus in art
 Nativity scene
 Nativity of Jesus in later culture
 Christmas Eve